Tiia-Riitta Johanna Reima (born 1 February 1973) is a Finnish retired ice hockey player and coach.

Playing career
A trailblazer of women's ice hockey in Finland, her career with the Finnish national ice hockey team began in the mid-1980s, the early days of women’s international ice hockey competition, and spanned nearly two decades. During her tenure with the national team, she was one of Finland’s most productive and decorated forwards, winning five IIHF World Women's Championship bronze medals, five IIHF European Women Championship medals (four gold and one bronze), and an Olympic bronze in 1998.

Reima’s club career spanned 26 seasons and was played in Finland with Ilves-Kiekko, Ilves Tampere, IHK Helsinki, and the Espoo Blues of the Naisten SM-sarja, and in Switzerland with SC Lyss Damen and the Ladies Team Lugano of the Leistungsklasse A (LKA; renamed SWHL A in 2014).

Coaching career
She served as coach to the Espoo Blues during 2011 to 2013 and as assistant coach during the 2013–14 season, winning the Aurora Borealis Cup in 2013 and 2014. She was assistant coach to Espoo United Naiset during the 2016–17 season, in which they achieved silver in the Finnish Championship.

Honours and achievements
Prior to the 2010–11 season, the Naisten SM-sarja renamed its annual award recognizing the top goal scorer in the regular season, dubbing it the Tiia Reima Award. The rebranding of the league as Naisten Liiga for the 2017–18 season, did not impact the trophy, which has been awarded in every season since the renaming.

See also
 Finnish Hockey Hall of Fame

References

External links 
 
 
 
 

1973 births
Living people
Finnish women's ice hockey forwards
Ice hockey people from Tampere
Ice hockey players at the 1998 Winter Olympics
Ice hockey players at the 2002 Winter Olympics
Medalists at the 1998 Winter Olympics
Olympic bronze medalists for Finland
Olympic medalists in ice hockey
Olympic ice hockey players of Finland
Espoo Blues Naiset players
Ilves Naiset players
IHK Naiset players
Finnish expatriate ice hockey players in Switzerland
Naisten Liiga (ice hockey) coaches